This article contains records and statistics related to the All-Ireland Senior Football Championship, which has run since 1887.

Most successful teams

By county

a.  London received a bye to the final in five seasons.

Counties

By decade
The most successful team of each decade, judged by number of All-Ireland titles, is as follows:

 1890s: 6 for Dublin (1891-92-94-97-98-99)
 1900s: 5 for Dublin (1901-02-06-07-08)
 1910s: 4 for Wexford (1915-16-17-18)
 1920s: 3 each for Dublin (1921-22-23) and Kerry (1924-26-29)
 1930s: 5 for Kerry (1930-31-32-37-39)
 1940s: 3 for Kerry (1940-41-46)
 1950s: 3 for Kerry (1953-55-59)
 1960s: 3 each for Down (1960-61-68) and Galway (1964-65-66)
 1970s: 4 for Kerry (1970-75-78-79)
 1980s: 5 for Kerry (1980-81-84-85-86)
 1990s: 2 each for Down (1991-94) and Meath (1996–99)
 2000s: 5 for Kerry (2000-04-06-07-09)
 2010s: 7 for Dublin (2011-13-15-16-17-18-19)
 2020s: 1 each for Dublin (2020), Tyrone (2021) and Kerry (2022)

Consecutive wins

Sextuple
 Dublin (2015, 2016, 2017, 2018, 2019, 2020)

Quadruple
 Wexford (1915, 1916, 1917, 1918)
 Kerry (1929, 1930, 1931, 1932)
 Kerry (1978, 1979, 1980, 1981)

Treble
 Dublin (1897, 1898, 1899)
 Dublin (1906, 1907, 1908)
 Dublin (1921, 1922, 1923)
 Kerry (1939, 1940, 1941)
 Galway (1964, 1965, 1966)
 Kerry (1984, 1985, 1986)

Double
 Dublin (1891, 1892)
 Dublin (1901, 1902)
 Kerry (1903, 1904)
 Kerry (1913, 1914)
 Kildare (1927, 1928)
 Roscommon (1943, 1944)
 Cavan (1947, 1948)
 Mayo (1950, 1951)
 Down (1960, 1961)
 Kerry (1969, 1970)
 Offaly (1971, 1972)
 Dublin (1976, 1977)
 Meath (1987, 1988)
 Cork (1989, 1990)
 Kerry (2006, 2007)

Single
 Limerick (1887, 1896)
 Tipperary (1889, 1895, 1900, 1920)
 Cork (1890, 1911, 1945, 1973, 2010)
 Wexford (1893)
 Dublin (1894, 1942, 1958, 1963, 1974, 1983, 1995, 2011, 2013)
 Kildare (1905, 1919)
 Kerry (1909, 1924, 1926, 1937, 1946, 1953, 1955, 1959, 1962, 1975, 1997, 2000, 2004, 2009, 2014, 2022)
 Louth (1910, 1912, 1957)
 Galway (1925, 1934, 1938, 1956, 1998, 2001)
 Cavan (1933, 1935, 1952)
 Mayo (1936)
 Meath (1949, 1954, 1967, 1996, 1999)
 Down (1968, 1991, 1994)
 Offaly (1982)
 Donegal (1992, 2012)
 Derry (1993)
 Armagh (2002)
 Tyrone (2003, 2005, 2008, 2021)

By semi-final appearances
As of 1 August 2022

By province

Most successful provinces
 Cavan and Down are the Ulster teams with the most All-Ireland titles.
 Dublin are the Leinster team with the most All-Ireland titles.
 Galway are the Connacht team with the most All-Ireland titles.
 Kerry are the Munster team with the most All-Ireland titles.

Total = Appearances in an All-Ireland Final

Provinces with highest number of different winning counties
The provinces providing the highest number of different winning counties are Leinster and Ulster, with six each. Dublin, Meath, Wexford, Kildare, Offaly and Louth from Leinster have won the title, while Cavan, Down, Tyrone, Donegal, Armagh and Derry are the successful Ulster sides. For Leinster's 12 counties, this represents a success rate of 50%, while Ulster's nine counties gives them a success rate of 67%. Four of Munster's six counties have won the title, giving an identical success rate to Ulster, while three of Connacht's five counties have been successful, a success rate of 60%.

Finals featuring two teams from the same province
There have only been three occasions has the All-Ireland Final been contested by two teams from the same province:
 Ulster: Tyrone vs Armagh (2003)
 Munster: Kerry vs Cork (2007)
 Munster: Kerry vs Cork (2009)

Least successful counties
There are seven counties that have never been represented in a Senior All-Ireland Final. These are Carlow, Fermanagh, Leitrim, Sligo, Westmeath, Wicklow, and Longford. New York GAA. Two of these counties Westmeath and Wicklow, have never competed in a semi-final.

Kilkenny currently do not compete in the All-Ireland Championship, having won three Leinster Senior Football Championships in the past, with the county instead prominent in the sport of hurling but have won the Junior All Ireland in 2022. Carlow also compete in hurling and have won an All-Ireland Senior B Hurling Championship. Westmeath have enjoyed considerable success in hurling in recent years, winning a number of All-Ireland Senior B Hurling Championships and Christy Ring Cups, and their Gaelic football team won the 2004 Leinster Football Championship and the inaugural Tailteann Cup in 2022. 

Fermanagh came their closest in 2004, reaching a semi-final replay having defeated 1999 Champions Meath, 2002 Munster Champions Cork, 2003 All-Ireland semi-finalists Donegal and 2002 Champions Armagh. Wicklow's most notable recent achievement was winning the 2012 NFL Division 4 final.

Final records and statistics

Success rates
100%
 One county currently have a 100% record in their All-Ireland Final appearances.
 Limerick
 Note: Limerick won the first ever All-Ireland Senior Football Championship Final and its 100% success rate has only ever been threatened once - in 1896. It remained intact.
 Historic 100% success rates (when a team won their first All-Ireland Final before losing a final at a later time) are:
 Tipperary (1889-1918)
 Dublin (1891-1896)
 Kildare (1905-1926)
 Roscommon (1943-1946)
 Down (1960-2010)
 Donegal (1992-2014)

0%
 On the opposite end of the scale, three counties have appeared in the All-Ireland Final on only one occasion. All three lost.
 Waterford (1898)
 Clare (1917)
 Monaghan (1930)
 Three counties have appeared in the final more than once and lost on each occasion:
 Laois (1889, 1936)
 Antrim (1911, 1912)
 London (1900, 1901, 1902, 1903, 1908)
 Note: In each of London's first four appearances in the Final, they have been the beneficiaries of byes to that stage. From the 1900 Championship to the 1903 Championship, the GAA ran the competition between teams based in Ireland first, with the winners of the 'Home Final' going on to play London in the 'Grand Final'. In 1908 London qualified for the Final by winning the semi-final.

Losing Counties
 Kerry, Cork, Dublin, Galway and Mayo have lost the most All-Ireland Finals.
 Kerry have lost 23 finals;
 Cork have lost 16 finals;
 Dublin have lost 13 finals;
 Galway have lost 13 finals;
 Mayo have lost 15 finals.

Biggest All-Ireland final winning margins
 The five most one sided All-Ireland Finals and their margins of victory:
 19 points – 1911: Cork 6-06 – 1-02 Antrim
 18 points – 1936: Mayo 4-11 – 0-05 Laois
 18 points - 1930: Kerry 3-11 - 0-2 Monaghhan
 17 points – 1978: Kerry 5-11 – 0-09 Dublin
 14 points – 1900: Tipperary 3-07 – 0-02 London

Semi final Winning Margins
 The five most one sided All-Ireland Semi-Finals and their margins of victory:
 27 points – 1901: Cork 4-16 – 0-01 Mayo
 22 points – 1979: Kerry 5-14 – 0-07 Monaghan
 21 points - 1904: Kerry 4-10 - 0-01 Cavan
 20 points – 1993: Cork 5-15 – 0-10 Mayo
 19 points – 1902: Dublin 4-16 – 1-06 Armagh

Quarter final winning margins
 The six most one sided All-Ireland Quarter-Finals and their margins of victory:
 27 points – 2015: Kerry 7-16 – 0-10 Kildare
 22 points – 2017: Mayo 4-19 – 0-09 Roscommon
 19 points – 2003: Tyrone 1-21 - 0-05 Fermanagh
 18 points – 2019: Dublin 2-26 - 0-14 Roscommon
18 points – 2017: Tyrone 3-17 – 0-08 Armagh
18 points – 2018: Tyrone 4-24 – 2-12 Roscommon

Munster final winning margins
 The five most one sided Munster Finals and their margins of victory:
 23 points - 2022: Kerry 1-28 - 0-08 Limerick
 23 points – 1919: Kerry 6-11 – 2-00 Clare
 22 points – 2021: Kerry 4-22 – 1-09 Cork
 21 points – 1931: Kerry 5-08 – 0-02 Tipperary
 20 points - 1925: Kerry 5-05 - 0-00 Clare

Leinster final winning margins
 The five most one sided Leinster Finals and their margins of victory:
 23 points – 2008: Dublin 3-23 – 0-09 Wexford
21 points – 2020: Dublin 3-21 – 0-09 Meath
 20 points – 1955: Dublin 5-12 – 0-07 Meath *this is the biggest ever defeat of a reigning All Ireland champion team (to 2018).
 18 points - 1951: Meath 4-09 - 0-03 Laois
 18 points – 2018: Dublin 1-25 – 0-10 Laois

Connacht final winning margins
 The five most one sided Connacht Finals and their margins of victory:
 26 points – 2015: Mayo 6-25 – 2-11 Sligo
 20 points – 1967: Mayo 4-15 – 0-07 Leitrim
 17 points - 1907: Mayo 3-09 - 0-01 Galway
 16 points – 1956: Galway 4-08 – 0-04 Leitrim
 16 points – 2013: Mayo 5-11 – 0-10 London

Ulster final winning margins
 The five most one sided Ulster Finals and their margins of victory:
 26 points – 1933: Cavan 6-13 – 1-02 Tyrone
 21 points – 1923: Cavan 5-10 – 1-01 Monaghan
 20 points - 1942: Cavan 5-11 - 1-03 Down
 19 points – 1919: Cavan 5-06 – 0-02 Antrim
 15 points – 2003: Tyrone 0-23 – 1-05 Down

Longest gap between successive All-Ireland titles
 Counties that waited more than two decades between winning the All-Ireland.
45 years: Louth (1912–1957)
 34 years: Cork (1911–1945)
 32 years: Galway (1966–1998)
 28 years: Cork (1945–1973)
 23 years: Down (1968–1991)
 22 years: Wexford (1893–1915)
 21 years: Cork (1890–1911)
 20 years: Cork (1990–2010)
 20 years: Donegal (1992–2012)

Longest gap between All-Ireland final appearances
 Counties that waited more than two decades between appearances in the All-Ireland Final.
 63 years: Kildare (1935–1998)
 47 years: Laois (1889–1936)
 44 years: Meath (1895–1939)
 38 years: Louth (1912–1950)
 38 years: Mayo (1951–1989)
 35 years: Derry (1958–1993)
 34 years: Cork (1911–1945)
 25 years: Armagh (1977–2002)
 24 years: Armagh (1953–1977)
 23 years: Down (1968–1991)

Counties in an All-Ireland final without a provincial title
Bold = Champions

 2001: Galway
 2002: Kerry
 2003: Armagh
 2005: Tyrone
 2006: Kerry
 2007: Cork
 2008: Kerry
 2008: Tyrone
 2009: Kerry
 2010: Down
 2010: Cork
 2016: Mayo
 2017: Mayo
 2018: Tyrone

More than once
 4 Kerry: 2002, 2006, 2008, 2009
 3 Tyrone: 2005, 2008, 2018
 2 Mayo: 2016, 2017
The 2008 and 2010 finals featured two teams that had not won their provincial championship that year.

Disciplinary
In 1943, Joe Stafford of Cavan became the first player to be sent off in an All-Ireland Senior football final. Others to have been sent off since then include John Donnellan of Galway and the brothers Derry O'Shea and John 'Thorny' O'Shea of Kerry in 1965, Charlie Nelligan of Kerry in 1978, Páidí Ó Sé of Kerry in 1979, Brian Mullins, Kieran Duff, Ray Hazley of Dublin and Tomás Tierney of Galway in 1983, Gerry McEntee of Meath in the 1988 replay, Tony Davis of Cork in 1993, Charlie Redmond of Dublin in 1995, Liam McHale of Mayo and Colm Coyle of Meath in the 1996 replay, Nigel Nestor of Meath in 2001, Diarmaid Marsden of Armagh in 2003, Donal Vaughan of Mayo in 2017, John Small of Dublin in 2017 and again in 2018, Jonny Cooper of Dublin in the 2019 drawn game, and Matthew Ruane of Mayo in 2021.

Nine players have received black cards during All-Ireland finals: Johnny Buckley and Aidan O'Mahony, both of Kerry, in the 2014 and 2015 finals, respectively; James McCarthy of Dublin in the 2016 drawn game; Jonny Cooper of Dublin and Rob Hennelly and Lee Keegan of Mayo in the 2016 replay; Ciarán Kilkenny of Dublin in 2017; Kieran McGeary of Tyrone in 2018 and Robbie McDaid of Dublin in 2020.

Galway holds the record of losing a final to a team containing the fewest players, they were beaten by a Dublin team which had been reduced to just 12 players in the All-Ireland Final of 1983.

Fastest goals in Finals

 12 seconds- Dean Rock (2020)
 35 seconds - Garry McMahon (1962)
 35 seconds - Johnny O'Connor (1980)
 49 seconds - Paul Geaney (2014)

 1 minute - Con O'Callaghan  (2017) 
 3 minutes - Michael Murphy (2012)
 4 minutes - Alan Dillon (2004)
 5 minutes - Joe Kavanagh (1993)
 6 minutes - Dara Ó Cinnéide (2005)

Players

All-time top scorers

As of match played 10 July 2022 (21:00)

All-time appearances
As of match played 29 September 2022 (21:00)

Other records

Most wins

 12 players have won eight All-Ireland medals: 
Pat Spillane of Kerry: 1975, 1978, 1979, 1980, 1981, 1984, 1985, 1986
Páidí Ó Sé of Kerry: 1975, 1978, 1979, 1980, 1981, 1984, 1985, 1986
Mikey Sheehy of Kerry: 1975, 1978, 1979, 1980, 1981, 1984, 1985, 1986
Denis "Ógie" Moran of Kerry: 1975, 1978, 1979, 1980, 1981, 1984, 1985, 1986
Ger Power of Kerry: 1975, 1978, 1979, 1980, 1981, 1984, 1985, 1986
Stephen Cluxton of Dublin: 2011, 2013, 2015, 2016, 2017, 2018, 2019, 2020
Michael Fitzsimons of Dublin: 2011, 2013, 2015, 2016, 2017, 2018, 2019, 2020
Philly McMahon of Dublin: 2011, 2013, 2015, 2016, 2017, 2018, 2019, 2020
Kevin McManamon of Dublin: 2011, 2013, 2015, 2016, 2017, 2018, 2019, 2020
James McCarthy of Dublin: 2011, 2013, 2015, 2016, 2017, 2018, 2019, 2020
Cian O'Sullivan of Dublin: 2011, 2013, 2015, 2016, 2017, 2018, 2019, 2020
Michael Darragh MacAuley of Dublin: 2011, 2013, 2015, 2016, 2017, 2018, 2019, 2020
These players have won seven All-Ireland medals both on the field of play and as substitutes: 
Eoghan O'Gara of Dublin: 2011, 2013, 2015, 2016, 2017, 2018, 2019
Darren Daly of Dublin: 2011, 2013, 2015, 2016, 2017, 2018, 2019
Bernard Brogan Jr. of Dublin: 2011, 2013, 2015, 2016, 2017, 2018, 2019
Dean Rock of Dublin: 2013, 2015, 2016, 2017, 2018, 2019, 2020
Ciarán Kilkenny of Dublin: 2013, 2015, 2016, 2017, 2018, 2019, 2020
Jonny Cooper of Dublin: 2013, 2015, 2016, 2017, 2018, 2019, 2020
Cormac Costello of Dublin: 2013, 2015, 2016, 2017, 2018, 2019, 2020
Dan O'Keeffe of Kerry: 1931, 1932, 1937, 1939, 1940, 1941, 1946
Jack O'Shea of Kerry: 1978, 1979, 1980, 1981, 1984, 1985, 1986
Eoin Liston of Kerry: 1978, 1979, 1980, 1981, 1984, 1985, 1986

Individual scoring

Cillian O'Connor's four goals (accompanied by nine points) in the 2020 All-Ireland Senior Football Championship semi-final at Croke Park broke the 5–3 record set by Johnny Joyce of Dublin in 1960 and matched with 3–9 by Rory Gallagher of Fermanagh in 2002 and O'Connor himself having scored 3-9 vs Limerick in 2018 for the highest individual scorer in any championship football match.

Team results table
This section represents in colour-coded tabular format the results of GAA county teams in the All-Ireland Senior Football Championship since 2001.

Prior to 2001, counties played in separate provincial championships, with only four provincial champions coming together in the All-Ireland semi-finals, and it is difficult to directly compare results across counties. Since 2001, beaten teams from the provincial championships play together in the All-Ireland qualifier series.

However, it must be remembered that counties from the smaller provinces (Connacht with seven county teams and Munster with six) have a slight advantage over those from the larger provinces (Leinster with eleven county teams and Ulster with nine) — they may receive a bye to the provincial semi-final and thus enter the second round of the qualifiers without winning a game, while counties from the larger provinces have to defeat one or even two opponents to reach the provincial semi-final.

The old single knockout format was reintroduced in 2020 and 2021 due to the COVID-19 pandemic. 

In 2022 a new competition was introduced, the Tailteann Cup, for teams that finished 17th–32nd in the National Football League and that did not reach their provincial final. These teams go straight into the Tailteann Cup and do not progress to the qualifiers.

Legend
Used in all seasons
 ♦ — provincial champions
  — All-Ireland champions
  — Runners-up (2nd place)
  — All-Ireland semi-finals (3rd–4th place)

2023
  — All-Ireland quarter-finals (5th–8th place)
  — All-Ireland preliminary quarter-finals (9th–12th place)
  — All-Ireland round-robin (13th–16th place)
  — Tailteann Cup top 4 (17th–20th place)
 TCx — Tailteann Cup, other place (21st–32nd place)

2022
  — All-Ireland qualifiers, round 2 (9th–12th place)
  — All-Ireland qualifiers, round 1 (13th–16th place)

2020–21

These are the colour-codes used for 2020 and 2021. X stands for the first letter of the province, e.g. Lpr is Leinster preliminary round, Cf is Connacht final.
  — Provincial finalists (5th–8th place); Galway in 2020 are not counted as provincial finalists as they did not win any games prior
  — teams that won two provincial games before being eliminated (9th place)
   — teams that won one provincial game before being eliminated (8th–16th place)
     — teams that lost their only game (16th–31st place)

2018–19
  — All-Ireland "Super 8" quarter-final groups (5th–8th place)
  — All-Ireland qualifiers, round 4 (9th–12th place)
  — All-Ireland qualifiers, round 3 (13th–16th place)
  — All-Ireland qualifiers, round 2 (17th–24th place)
 q1 — All-Ireland qualifiers, round 1 (25th–32nd place)

2001–17
Quarter-finals were played as single matches between 2001 and 2017.
  — All-Ireland quarter-finals (5th–8th place)

In 2007 and 2008, teams from Division 4 of the National Football League did not get to play in the qualifiers, instead going straight into the Tommy Murphy Cup, a secondary competition. In those years, there were only three rounds of qualifiers.

  — All-Ireland qualifiers, round 3 (9th–12th place)
  — All-Ireland qualifiers, round 2 (13th–16th place)
  — All-Ireland qualifiers, round 1 (17th–24th place)
Cqf, Cqr — Connacht quarter-final or preliminary round (New York did not compete in the qualifiers)
 TM1 — Tommy Murphy Cup winners (25th place)
 TM2 — Tommy Murphy Cup finalists (26th place)
 TMsf — Tommy Murphy Cup semi-finalists (27th–28th place)
 TMqf — Tommy Murphy Cup quarter-finalists (29th–32nd place)

Table

See also
 All-Ireland Senior Hurling Championship records and statistics

References

Records and statistics
Gaelic games records and statistics